Brent Hollamby (born 12 July 1964) is a New Zealand wrestler. He competed in the men's freestyle 57 kg at the 1988 Summer Olympics.

References

1964 births
Living people
New Zealand male sport wrestlers
Olympic wrestlers of New Zealand
Wrestlers at the 1988 Summer Olympics
People from Mosgiel